Iosif Covaci was born on 2 December,1912 in Brasov, Austria-Hungary. He was a Romanian alpine skier. He competed in the men's combined event at the 1936 Winter Olympics.

References

1912 births
Year of death missing
Romanian male alpine skiers
Romanian male cross-country skiers
Olympic alpine skiers of Romania
Olympic cross-country skiers of Romania
Alpine skiers at the 1936 Winter Olympics
Cross-country skiers at the 1936 Winter Olympics
Sportspeople from Brașov